Damage is Kosheen's third studio album, released on 23 March 2007. The album was originally due to be released in 2006, however it was pushed back to 2007. The first single released was "Overkill".

Track listing

European edition
Released on 23 March 2007 (All songs by Sian Evans, Darren Beale, Mark Morrison)
"Damage" – 6:30
"Overkill" – 3:38
"Like a Book" – 3:35
"Same Ground Again" – 4:40
"Guilty" – 3:30
"Chances" – 3:35
"Out of This World" – 4:51
"Wish You Were Here" – 4:57
"Thief" – 4:36
"Under Fire" – 3:58
"Not Enough Love" – 5:17
"Cruel Heart" – 4:14
"Marching Orders" – 5:01
"Your Life" – 4:03

UK edition
Released on 10 September 2007 (All songs by Sian Evans, Darren Beale, Mark Morrison)
"Damage" – 6:30
"Overkill" – 3:38
"Like a Book" – 3:35
"Same Ground Again" – 4:40
"Guilty" (original) – 3:33
"Chances" – 3:35
"Out of This World" – 4:51
"Wish You Were Here" – 4:57
"Thief" – 4:36
"Under Fire" – 3:58
"Not Enough Love" – 5:17
"Cruel Heart" – 4:14
"Professional Friend" – 3:20
"Analogue Street Dub" – 5:52
"Marching Orders" – 5:01
"Your Life" – 4:03

Charts

References 

Kosheen albums
2007 albums